Sikhism in Singapore has its roots in the military and policing forces of the British Empire. Currently, there are 12,000-15,000 Sikhs in Singapore. There are 7 Sikh Temples along with a missionary society, a welfare society, two youth organizations and two sports clubs.

History

The first Sikh to migrate to Singapore was Maharaj Singh in 1849; he was sent there as a political prisoner by the British Empire after the Second Anglo-Sikh War. The Central Sikh Temple was built to commemorate the 518th anniversary of Guru Nanak, the first Sikh guru. The temple boasts a skilful blend of modern and traditional architecture. The Guru Granth Sahib, or holy book, is enshrined in a magnificent prayer hall which has a 13-metre wide dome.

Singapore was part of Malaya under British rule and Sikhs migrated there as policemen. Some Sikhs in Singapore are immigrants from India (mainly from the Punjab region in India). Others are the descendants of Sikh prisoners from British India who were sent to Singapore by the British Army for protesting, attacking or killing British Soldiers, attacks; assaults; and vandalism of British buildings and property. They lived in British prisons in Singapore. Sikh migration to Singapore was popularized by the demand of Sikh police officers and guards in British colonial Malaya. A substantial amount of Sikhs in Singapore are also descendants of Indian Sikh Businessmen who immigrated to Singapore. Most Sikhs today are from the Jat community.

Prominent Sikhs 
The Sikh Foundation and The Punjabi Foundation of Singapore are prominent associations that are promoting Sikh heritage and Punjabi language there. Some prominent Sikhs who earned name in public life are:

 Choor Singh, first Sikh Judge of Supreme Court
 Kanwaljit Soin, first female Nominated Member of Parliament, orthopaedic surgeon and co-founder of AWARE
 Jaswant Singh Gill, first commander of Singapore Navy
 Kartar Singh Thakral, founder of Thakral Corporation Ltd
 Major-General Ravinder Singh, former chief of the Singapore Army
 Inderjit Singh, former PAP MP for Ang Mo Kio GRC
 Davinder Singh, former PAP MP for Bishan–Toa Payoh GRC
 Pritam Singh, WP MP for Aljunied GRC and Leader of the Opposition

See also 
 Jainism in Southeast Asia
 Hinduism in Southeast Asia

References

External links
  Visit Singapore